Nyasa Times is an online newspaper providing Malawian news, founded by Edgar Chibaka, who remains its Managing Editor, assisted by Thom Chiumia. It began reporting in late 2006. According to its own website, it received "over 8 million hits per month" in 2010. 

The publication has on numerous occasion been at loggerheads with the Bingu wa Mutharika government. Mutharika accused former president Bakili Muluzi of bankrolling the online media outfit to publish false stories to tarnish the image of the government. Muluzi denied the accusations.

References

Newspapers published in Malawi
2006 establishments in Malawi
Publications established in 2006
African news websites